Luca Censoni (born 18 July 1996) is a Sammarinese footballer who plays as a midfielder for Tre Fiori and the San Marino national team.

Career
Censoni made his international debut for San Marino on 8 June 2019 in a UEFA Euro 2020 qualifying match against Russia, which finished as a 0–9 away loss.

Career statistics

International

References

External links
 
 
 
 

1996 births
Living people
Sammarinese footballers
San Marino youth international footballers
San Marino under-21 international footballers
San Marino international footballers
Sammarinese expatriate footballers
Sammarinese expatriate sportspeople in Italy
Expatriate footballers in Italy
Association football midfielders
Campionato Sammarinese di Calcio players
Rimini F.C. 1912 players
A.S.D. Victor San Marino players
S.P. Tre Penne players